Shevchenkivskyi District or Shevchenko Raion is a name of several urban raions (districts) in Ukraine. The name was commemorated to the memory of Taras Shevchenko.

It may refer to:

 Shevchenkivskyi District, Chernivtsi, an urban district in the city of Chernivtsi
 Shevchenkivskyi District, Dnipro, an urban district in the city of Dnipro
 Shevchenkivskyi District, Kharkiv, an urban district in the city of Kharkiv
 Shevchenkivskyi District, Kyiv, an urban district in the Ukrainian capital Kyiv
 Shevchenkivskyi District, Lviv, an urban district in the city of Lviv
 Shevchenkivskyi District, Zaporizhzhia, an urban district in the city of Zaporizhzhia

See also
 Korsun-Shevchenkivskyi Raion, a former raion in Cherkasy Oblast